Mango sticky rice is a traditional Southeast Asian and South Asian dessert made with glutinous rice, fresh mango and coconut milk, and eaten with a spoon or the hands.

Preparation 
Usually desserts involving sticky rice are sweetened with palm sugar or jaggery combined with coconut milk and coconut flakes, wrapped in banana leaf, then steamed or stuffed in bamboo and roasted on an open fire such as sticky rice in bamboo. The main ingredients needed are sticky rice (glutinous rice), canned or fresh coconut milk, salt, palm sugar and mangoes.

To prepare the dish, the rice is soaked in water and then cooked by steaming or the use of a rice cooker. Meanwhile, the coconut milk is mixed with salt and sugar then heated without boiling. After the rice is finished cooking, the coconut milk mixture and the rice are mixed together evenly and allowed to sit to allow the milk to absorb into the rice. The mangoes are peeled and sliced. To serve the dish, the rice is scooped onto a plate, a few mango slices are placed on top or to the side, and the remaining coconut milk is drizzled on top. Sometimes, the sticky rice is topped with crispy yellow mung beans.

Mostly, yellow mango is used which has a sweeter taste than green mango. Traditionally, the Nam Dok Mai (flower nectar mango) and ok-rong varieties of mango are used. Glutinous sticky rice, which is sweeter than the normal sticky rice, is used for the best texture.

Variations
These are variations to the classic mango sticky rice, such as substituting white sticky rice with black sticky rice, imparting a purple color.

In Thailand
Mango sticky rice is a common street food in Thailand and is considered an attractive factor by foreigner tourists for travelling in Thailand. It is usually eaten during the peak mango season of April and May. Common sweet mango cultivars, such as nam dawk mai or ok long, are combined with glutinous rice sweetened with coconut milk, and served warm.

In Laos
Mango sticky rice is a common dessert of the Lao people of the Greater Mekong Sub-region where glutinous rice has been cultivated over the history of food and myths. Sticky or glutinous rice is a Laos national dish connected to the culture and religious traditions. In mango-ripening season, sticky rice garnished with sweetened coconut milk and dry roasted sesame seeds is served with ripe mango pieces. Sticky rice may be served plain with only mango and no trimmings.

In the Philippines
A sticky rice snack cooked in coconut milk, and sometimes, ginger called puto maya is a favorite among the Visayan people. It is served with sweet ripe mangoes (if in season) and a hot chocolate. In Cagayan de Oro, a violet variety of sticky rice is used.

See also 

 Black beans sticky rice

References

Mangoes
Thai desserts and snacks
Cambodian desserts
Vietnamese desserts
Laotian desserts
Glutinous rice dishes